Pumpkin Center, Missouri may refer to one of these small communities in Missouri:

Pumpkin Center, Dallas County, Missouri
Pumpkin Center, Nodaway County, Missouri

See also
Pumpkin Center (disambiguation)